Merab Ilyich Chigoev (15 February 1951 – 9 January 2016) was a Georgian South Ossetian politician and former Prime Minister, from August 1998 until June 2001. He was also Minister of Justice in Yury Morozov's cabinet.

Chigoev graduated from the Lomonosov Moscow State University in 1973.

In the 2009 parliamentary election, Chigoev was a candidate for the Communist Party of South Ossetia. Chigoev was number 8 on the list, and as the party received enough votes for 8 seats, Chigoev was entitled to a seat in the Parliament of South Ossetia.

Chigoev was killed in a traffic accident in Tskhinvali on 9 January 2016.

References

1951 births
2016 deaths
People from Leningor district
Prime Ministers of South Ossetia
Members of the Parliament of South Ossetia
Communist Party of South Ossetia politicians
Road incident deaths in Georgia (country)